The 1992 Tippeligaen was the 48th completed season of top division football in Norway. Each team played 22 games with 3 points given for wins and 1 for draws. Number eleven and twelve are relegated. The winners of the two groups of the 1. divisjon are promoted, as well as the winner of a series of play-off matches between the two second placed teams in the two groups of the 1. divisjon and number ten in the Tippeligaen.

This season was the first of a 13-year-long streak of Rosenborg victories.

Teams and locations
''Note: Table lists in alphabetical order.

League table

Relegation play-offs
The qualification play-off matches were contested between HamKam (10th in Tippeligaen), Drøbak-Frogn (2nd in the First Division - Group A), and Strømmen (2nd in the First Division - Group B). HamKam won one game and drew one and remained in Tippeligaen.

Results
Match 1: Ham-Kam 2–1 Drøbak/Frogn
Match 2: Strømmen 4–4 Ham-Kam
Match 3: Drøbak/Frogn 2–0 Strømmen

Results

Season statistics

Top scorers

Attendances

References 

Eliteserien seasons
Norway
Norway
1